Pyne is a surname. Notable people with the surname include:

Bernard Pyne Grenfell
Chris Pyne
Christopher Pyne
Douglas Pyne
Frederick Pyne
Ganesh Pyne
George Pyne (disambiguation), multiple people
James Baker Pyne
James Kendrick Pyne
Jim Pyne
Joe Pyne
John Pyne
Ken Pyne, British cartoonist
Louisa Pyne (1832–1904), English soprano and opera company manager
Lydia V. Pyne (born 1979), American writer and historian of science
Moses Taylor Pyne
Natasha Pyne
Parker Pyne
Percy Pyne
Percy Rivington Pyne (disambiguation)
Richard Pyne
Rob Pyne
Robert Allan Pyne
Stephen J. Pyne
Tom Pyne
Valentine Pyne, master gunner of England, Royalist
William Henry Pyne

See also
Pyne (Indian surname)
Arthur Pyne O'Callaghan
Percy Rivington Pyne House
Upton Pyne apple
Jonathan Pyne House
Pyne's Ground-plum
Parker Pyne Investigates
Pyne Mine
Pyne Glacier
Pynes Town District
Upton Pyne

English-language surnames